Hökåsen is a locality situated in Västerås Municipality, Västmanland County, Sweden with 2,956 inhabitants in 2010.

References 

Populated places in Västmanland County
Populated places in Västerås Municipality